Klára Peslarová (born 23 November 1996) is a Czech ice hockey goaltender and member of the Czech national ice hockey team, currently playing in the Swedish Women's Hockey League (SDHL) with Brynäs IF Dam.

Playing career 

Peslarová developed in the minor ice hockey department of HC RT Torax Poruba in her home city of Ostrava, in the eastern Czech Republic. By age 14, she was playing with the HC Poruba men's under-16 (U16) team in the Junior Youth Extraliga (ELMD) and she first played with the HC Poruba men's under-18 (U18) team in the Senior Youth Extraliga (ELSD) at age 15.

She made her senior league debut with SK Karviná of the Women's 1st Hockey League (shortened to ), the top women's league in the Czech Republic, in the 2011–12 season. She continued to divide her playing time between the HC Poruba men's junior teams and the SK Karviná women's team during the 2012–13 and 2013–14 seasons, never playing more than 20 games in any league per season.

As her 18th birthday approached and she would no longer be eligible to play in Czech men's junior leagues, Peslarová looked abroad to further her development. For the 2014–15 season, she relocated to the Siberian city of Krasnoyarsk to sign with Biryusa Krasnoyarsk of the Russian Women's Hockey League (RWHL; replaced by the Zhenskaya Hockey League in 2015). Another relocation preceded the 2015–16 season, with Peslarová settling in Stockholm to join SDE Hockey of the Riksserien (renamed SDHL in 2016), as the team's starting goaltender.

After two seasons with SDE, Peslarová signed for the 2017–18 season with the men's representative B-team of HC Poruba in the Czech Regional Hockey Championship (abbreviated to Krajský přebor), the fourth-tier men's ice hockey league in the Czech Republic. During the season, she became the first woman to post a shutout in a Czech men's league, denying all thirteen shots on goal during a match against HK Nový Jičín. In addition to playing with HC Poruba B, she also returned to SK Karviná of the renamed Czech Women's Extraliga for the 2017–18 season.

After one season in the Czech Republic, Peslarová returned to Sweden to sign with her second SDHL club, MoDo Hockey in Örnsköldsvik.

International play 

Peslarová was the starting goaltender for the Czech national under-18 team in the 2013 and 2014 IIHF Women's World U18 Champhionships. She was named Best Goaltender by the directorate at the 2014 tournament, as she backstopped the Czech team to the second bronze medal in team history.

She represented the Czech Republic at the IIHF Women's World Championship in 2016, 2017, 2019, 2021, and 2022; and at the Division 1 Group A tournaments in 2014 and 2015. Following the 2022 tournament, she was named to the Media All-Star team.

Career statistics

Regular season and playoffs 

Sources:

International

Sources:

References

External links
 

1996 births
Living people
Biryusa Krasnoyarsk players
Brynäs IF Dam players
Czech expatriate ice hockey players in Russia
Czech expatriate ice hockey players in Sweden
Czech women's ice hockey goaltenders
Ice hockey players at the 2022 Winter Olympics
Modo Hockey Dam players
Olympic ice hockey players of the Czech Republic
SDE Hockey players
Sportspeople from Ostrava